From Within Shalom, or From Within, Shalom, is an outdoor 1984 granite sculpture by Steve Gillman, installed outside St. James Lutheran Church in Portland, Oregon, in the United States.

Description and history

Steve Gillman's From Within Shalom (1984) is a granite sculpture installed outside Portland's St. James Lutheran Church (1315 Southwest Park), which owns the work. It is part of Peace Plaza and was donated by Generations of Peace and Douglas Strain in memory of Cora Lee Beard Whiteneck, the mother of John Whiteneck of Generations for Peace. R. A. Gray & Company served as the project's contractor.

The abstract (geometric), allegorical (peace) sculpture cost $2,500 and measures approximately  x  x . The Smithsonian Institution describes the piece as "two tall narrow triangles facing each other, as though they are one triangle which has been split down the middle. The parts that face each other are rough hewn and the rest is smooth." The sculpture rests on a concrete or stone base that measures approximately  x  x . Nearby plaques display an original poem written for the work. It was surveyed and deemed "treatment needed" by Smithsonian's "Save Outdoor Sculpture!" program in May 1993.

See also
 1984 in art
 Peace Chant (1984) another Portland sculpture by Gillman
 Shalom

References

1984 establishments in Oregon
1984 sculptures
Abstract sculptures in Oregon
Allegorical sculptures in Oregon
Concrete sculptures in Oregon
Granite sculptures in Oregon
Monuments and memorials in Portland, Oregon
Outdoor sculptures in Portland, Oregon
Stone sculptures in Oregon
Southwest Portland, Oregon